Providence is a former settlement in Nevada County, California. It lay at an elevation of 2320 feet (707 m).

References

Former populated places in California
Former settlements in Nevada County, California